Irene Ivancan (born 22 July 1983) is a German table tennis player, born in Stuttgart. She competed in women's team at the 2012 Summer Olympics in London.

References

External links
 
 
 
 

1983 births
Living people
Sportspeople from Stuttgart
German female table tennis players
Olympic table tennis players of Germany
Table tennis players at the 2012 Summer Olympics
20th-century German women
21st-century German women